Catena Yuri is an elongate depression in Mare Imbrium on the moon.  The feature's name was approved by the IAU in 1976.

Catena Yuri lies to the south of Rima Zahia and east of Dorsum Thera.

References

External links
 

Mare Imbrium